This is a list of historic places in Lanaudière, entered on the Canadian Register of Historic Places, whether they are federal, provincial, or municipal. All addresses are the administrative Region 14. For all other listings in the province of Quebec, see List of historic places in Quebec.

References

See also 

 List of National Historic Sites of Canada in Quebec
 List of historic places in Quebec City
 Répertoire du patrimoine culturel du Québec

Lanaudiere
Lanaudière